Eresiomera phaeochiton is a butterfly in the family Lycaenidae. It is found in Equatorial Guinea, and possibly the Democratic Republic of the Congo (Maniema) and the Republic of the Congo.

References

Butterflies described in 1910
Poritiinae